Ri Yong-suk (17 April 1916 – November 2021) was a North Korean politician and revolutionary. A veteran of the anti-Japanese struggle, Ri had close relations with all three generations of the Kim dynasty. During WWII, she was with Kim Il-sung in the Soviet 88th Separate Rifle Brigade. During the Korean War, she took care of Kim Jong-il, eldest son and future heir of Kim Il-sung. Under Kim Jong-un, she was portrayed as a link between the original guerrilla generation and the current leadership. Ri was elected to the Supreme People's Assembly in 1998 and 2003.

Early life and Kim family
Ri Yong-suk was born on 17 April 1916. Ri fought as a guerrilla during the anti-Japanese struggle. During World War II, she was a member of the Soviet 88th Separate Rifle Brigade, to which Kim Il-sung was also attached. According to Kim, in his 1992 autobiography With the Century, Ri was married to An Yong:

Kim also wrote that Ri was trained as a radio operator. Speaking of her guerrilla days, she remembered both Kim's wife Kim Jong-suk and the birth of their son Kim Jong-il. Ri "recollected that Kim Jong Suk provided noble tradition of devotedly defending the leader and gave birth to General Secretary Kim Jong Il in the days of hard-fought anti-Japanese struggle, thus guaranteeing the brilliant future of Korea", and that:

In reality, Kim Jong-il was born in a military camp in the Soviet Union.

During the Korean War, Ri took care of Kim Jong-il. The two met often throughout Kim's life and career. Kim had even been seen embracing Ri, although he was known to rarely physically express affection. North Korean propaganda put effort in showing Ri in close terms with Kim Jong-un. The message is that Ri passed down lived guerrilla experience to Kim Jong-un.

In 2016, she was noted as being one of the few remaining female guerrilla (Northeast Anti-Japanese United Army) leaders.

Political career
After the liberation of Korea, she became the chairwoman of the management committee of a cooperative farm in Yonsan County in North Hwanghae Province.

Ri was elected to the Supreme People's Assembly in 1998 and 2003.

Later life and death
She was awarded the Jubilee Medal "70 Years of Victory in the Great Patriotic War 1941–1945" on 6 May 2015 by Vladimir Putin and Jubilee Medal "75 Years of Victory in the Great Patriotic War 1941–1945" on 6 May 2020.

Ri was on the funeral committees of Kim Chol-man, Ri Ul-sol, and Hwang Sun-hui.

She was awarded the Order of Kim Il-sung, Order of Kim Jong-il, and Hero of Labor, and also received a birthday spread sent from Kim Jong-un on the occasion of her 105th birthday.

Ri died in November 2021, at the age of 105. Kim Jong-un visited her grave at the Revolutionary Martyrs' Cemetery in Mount Taesong on November 15 to lay a wreath.

See also

 Politics of North Korea

References

Works cited

1916 births
2021 deaths
Place of birth missing
20th-century North Korean women politicians
20th-century North Korean politicians
Female military personnel
Military personnel of the Second Sino-Japanese War
North Korean centenarians
North Korean military personnel
21st-century North Korean women politicians
21st-century North Korean politicians
Soviet military personnel of World War II
Women centenarians
People of 88th Separate Rifle Brigade